Soraida is a genus of tephritid  or fruit flies in the family Tephritidae.

Species
Soraida tenebricosa Hering, 1941

References

Tephritinae
Tephritidae genera
Diptera of Asia